Splashdown is the method of landing a spacecraft by parachute in a body of water. It was used by crewed American space capsules prior to the Space Shuttle program, by SpaceX Dragon and Dragon 2 capsules and by NASA's Orion Multipurpose Crew Vehicle. It is also possible for the Russian Soyuz spacecraft to land in water, though this is only a contingency.  The only example of an unintentional crewed splashdown in Soviet history is the Soyuz 23 landing.

As the name suggests, the capsule parachutes into an ocean or other large body of water.  The properties of water cushion the spacecraft enough that there is no need for a braking rocket to slow the final descent as is the case with Russian and Chinese crewed space capsules (while Shenzhou designed a raft and balanced capsule in case of splashdown), which return to Earth over land. The American practice came in part because American launch sites are on the coastline and launch primarily over water. Russian launch sites are far inland and most early launch aborts were likely to descend on land.

Missions

The splashdown method of landing was used for Mercury, Gemini and Apollo (including Skylab, which used Apollo capsules).  Soyuz 23 unintentionally landed on a freezing lake with slushy patches of ice during a snowstorm.

On early Mercury flights, a helicopter attached a cable to the capsule, lifted it from the water and delivered it to a nearby ship. This was changed after the sinking of Liberty Bell 7. All later Mercury, Gemini and Apollo capsules had a flotation collar (similar to a rubber life raft) attached to the spacecraft to increase their buoyancy. The spacecraft would then be brought alongside a ship and lifted onto deck by crane.

After the flotation collar is attached, a hatch on the spacecraft is usually opened. At that time, some astronauts decide to be hoisted aboard a helicopter for a ride to the recovery ship and some decided to stay with the spacecraft and be lifted aboard ship via crane.  All Gemini and Apollo flights (Apollos 7 to 17) used the former, while Mercury missions from Mercury 6 to Mercury 9, as well as all Skylab missions and Apollo-Soyuz used the latter, especially the Skylab flights as to preserve all medical data. During the Gemini and Apollo programs, NASA used  for the astronauts to practice water egress.

Apollo 11 was America's first Moon landing mission and marked the first time that humans walked on the surface of another planetary body. The possibility of the astronauts bringing "Moon germs" back to Earth was remote, but not impossible. To contain any possible contaminants at the scene of the splashdown, the astronauts donned special Biological Isolation Garments and the outside of the suits were scrubbed prior to the astronauts being hoisted aboard  and escorted safely inside a Mobile Quarantine Facility.

Both the SpaceX Dragon and Dragon 2 capsules were designed to use the splashdown method of landing. The original cargo Dragon splashed down in the Pacific Ocean off the coast of Baja California. At the request of NASA, both the crew and cargo variations of the Dragon 2 capsule splashes down off the coast of Florida, either in the Atlantic Ocean or the Gulf of Mexico.

The early design concept for the new U.S. Orion Crew Exploration Vehicle featured recovery on land using a combination of parachutes and airbags, although it was also designed to make a contingency splashdown (only for an in-flight abort) if needed. Due to weight considerations, the airbag design concept was dropped.  The present design concept features landings via splashdown in the Pacific Ocean off the coast of California.

Disadvantages
The most dangerous aspect is the possibility of the spacecraft flooding and sinking. For example, when the hatch of Gus Grissom's Liberty Bell 7 capsule blew prematurely, the capsule sank and Grissom almost drowned.

Since the spacecraft's flooding will occur from a location in its hull where it ruptures first, it is important to determine the location on the hull that experiences the highest loading. This location along the impacting side is determined by the surrounding `air cushion' layer, which deforms the water surface before the moment of impact, and results in a non-trivial geometry of the liquid surface during first touch-down.

If the capsule comes down far from any recovery forces, the crew are exposed to greater danger. These recovery operation mishaps can be mitigated by placing several vessels on standby in several different locations, but this is quite an expensive option.

Locations

Crewed spacecraft

Uncrewed spacecraft

Gallery

See also

Apollo program
Apollo–Soyuz Test Project
Helicopter 66
Project Gemini
Project Mercury
Skylab
SpaceX Dragon
SpaceX Dragon 2
Water landing
Zond program

Notes

Bibliography

External links

Spaceflight concepts
Lists of coordinates
Types of landing